Ramón Bucetta (born 13 September 1894, date of death unknown) was a Uruguayan footballer. He played in two matches for the Uruguay national football team in 1928. He was also part of Uruguay's squad for the 1924 South American Championship.

References

External links
 

1894 births
Year of death missing
Uruguayan footballers
Uruguay international footballers
Place of birth missing
Association football defenders
Peñarol players
Club Nacional de Football players